Dato Sri Sulaiman Abdul Rahman bin Abdul Taib (born 31 May 1968) is a former Deputy Minister of Tourism of Malaysia. He is the 3rd son of Abdul Taib Mahmud who is the current Yang di-Pertua Negeri Sarawak while his mother was the late Laila Taib. Sulaiman wed 20-year-old Anisa, daughter of the former Deputy Chief Minister of Sarawak George Chan Hong Nam.

Business

Malaysia
Sulaiman holds a Bachelor of Science degree in Business Administration from the University of San Francisco. Sulaiman was the group chairman of CMSB from 2002 to 2006, and the former RHB Bank chairman from May 2003 to 2006 following the takeover of RHB by CMS's Utama Banking group. He became the youngest chairman of the local bank at that time. He worked with his brother, Dato Sri Mahmud Abu Bekir Taib, brother-in-law Datuk Syed Ahmad Alwee Alsree and other board of directors of CMSB.

United States
Sulaiman was reported to be the sole officer and director of Sakti International Corporation and Wallyson's Inc. in the United States, companies reportedly owned by the Taib family.

Political career

Deputy Minister of Tourism
During the last 12th Malaysian General Election held in March 2008, Sulaiman stood as a candidate in the Kota Samarahan parliamentary seat previously held by his father, Pehin Sri Abdul Taib Mahmud and won under the then Malaysian ruling coalition Barisan Nasional (BN) ticket. Following his win in his parliamentary seat, he was appointed as a Deputy Minister of Tourism in the cabinet of the then Prime Minister Abdullah Ahmad Badawi. Under the new cabinet line-up of Prime Minister Najib Razak, he was once appointed again as a Deputy Minister of Tourism.

On 4 December 2009, Sulaiman resigned from his deputy ministerial post. Prime Minister Najib Razak accepted Sulaiman's resignation effective on 14 December 2009. Sulaiman was succeeded by Datuk Dr. James Dawos Mamit.

In 2002, Sulaiman was named the Knight Commander of the Order of the Star of Sarawak.

Election results

Honours
  :
  Knight Commander of the Most Exalted Order of the Star of Sarawak (PNBS) – Dato Sri (2002)

References

1968 births
People from Sarawak
Living people
Malaysian people of Polish descent
Knights Commander of the Most Exalted Order of the Star of Sarawak
Parti Pesaka Bumiputera Bersatu politicians
Members of the Dewan Rakyat